, was the 3rd head of a collateral branch of the Japanese Imperial Family.

Early life
Prince Naruhisa was the son of Prince Yoshihisa Kitashirakawa and Princess Tomiko. Prince Naruhisa succeeded as head of the house of Kitashirakawa-no-miya after the death of his father in November 1895 during the First Sino-Japanese War. He was the brother of Prince Tsunehisa Takeda and classmate of Prince Yasuhiko Asaka, Prince Naruhiko Higashikuni and Prince Fumimaro Konoe (peer). Prince Naruhisa graduated from the 20th class of the Imperial Japanese Army Academy with a commission as a sub-lieutenant in 1904, and the 27th class of the Army Staff College with the rank of colonel. His field of study was artillery.

Marriage and family
On 29 April 1909, Prince Kitashirakawa married Fusako, Princess Kane (1890–1974), the seventh daughter of Emperor Meiji. Prince and Princess Kitashirakawa had one son and three daughters:
  Married Sachiko Tokugawa
 ; Married Viscount Tanekatsu Tachibana
 ; Married Viscount Motofumi Higashizono
 ; Married Yoshihisa Tokugawa.

Later life
Between 1922 and 1923, Prince Naruhisa studied military tactics at the École Spéciale Militaire de Saint-Cyr in France, along with his cousins Prince Naruhiko Higashikuni and Prince Yasuhiko Asaka. However, on 1 April 1923, he was killed in Perriers-la-Campagne, a Paris suburb, in an automobile accident that seriously injured Princess Kitashirakawa (who had accompanied her husband to Paris), and which left Prince Asaka with a limp for the rest of his life.

Dowager Princess Kitashirakawa became a commoner on 14 October 1947, with the abolition of the collateral branches of the Japanese Imperial Family by the American occupation authorities. The former princess served as custodian and chief priestess of the Ise Shrine until her death on 11 August 1974.

Gallery

Notes

References
 Fujitani,T. Splendid Monarchy: Power and Pageantry in Modern Japan. University of California Press; Reprint edition (1998). 
 Lebra, Sugiyama Takie. Above the Clouds: Status Culture of the Modern Japanese Nobility. University of California Press (1995). 
 Takenobu, Yoshitaro. (1906). The Japan Year Book. Tokyo: Japan Year Book Office. OCLC 1771764

1887 births
1923 deaths
École Spéciale Militaire de Saint-Cyr alumni
Kitashirakawa-no-miya
Japanese princes
Japanese Army officers
People from Tokyo
People of Meiji-period Japan
Road incident deaths in France